Route 420, also known as White Bay South Highway,  is a  north-south highway located in the western region of Newfoundland in the Canadian province of Newfoundland and Labrador.  It starts at its southern terminus at an intersection on the Trans-Canada Highway (Route 1), near Sandy Lake, and ends at its northern terminus, the town of Jackson's Arm, passing through several other communities in between.

Route description

Route 420 begins at an intersection with Route 1 (Trans-Canada Highway) along the northern shore of Sandy Lake (part of Grand Lake) and it heads north to immediately have an intersection with Route 422 (Cormack Road) before heading through rural areas for several kilometres. Route 422 is not signed at this intersection, through the designation and road both exist. The highway now has an intersection with Route 421 (Hampden Road) before heading up a narrow valley through hilly terrain for several kilometres to pass through Pollards Point and cross the Main River (via the Main River Bridge) before having an intersection with a local road leading to Sop's Arm. Route 420 passes through more rural and hilly terrain for several more kilometres to enter Jackson's Arm, where it ends at the former Great Harbour Deep Ferry docks after passing through town.

Major intersections

References

420